Herman Ese'ese (born 7 September 1994) is a professional rugby league footballer who plays as a  and  for the Dolphins in the NRL. He has played for both New Zealand and Samoa at international level.

He previously played for the Canterbury-Bankstown Bulldogs, Brisbane Broncos, Newcastle Knights and the Gold Coast Titans in the National Rugby League.

Background
Ese'ese was born in Auckland, New Zealand. He is of Samoan descent.

He played his junior rugby league for the Mangere East Hawks and Wests Panthers, before being signed by the Canterbury-Bankstown Bulldogs in 2011.

Ese'ese is the nephew of New Zealand Kiwis international Ali Lauiti'iti.

Playing career

Early career
In 2013 and 2014, Ese'ese played for the Canterbury-Bankstown Bulldogs' NYC team.

2015
In 2015, Ese'ese graduated to the Canterbury-Bankstown Bulldogs' New South Wales Cup team. In Round 7 of the 2015 NRL season, he made his NRL debut for the Canterbury-Bankstown club against the Manly Warringah Sea Eagles. He was contracted to the Bulldogs until the end of 2016, however, after being stood down in April due to a drink driving charge, he was released from the final year of his contract. Late in the year, he signed with the Souths Logan Magpies in the Queensland Cup for 2016, while training with the Brisbane Broncos during the 2016 pre-season.

2016
After gaining a contract with the Brisbane Broncos during the pre-season, Ese'ese made his Brisbane debut against South Sydney in Round 8 of the season. In September, he re-signed with the Brisbane club on a two-year contract until the end of 2018.

2017
Ese’ese earned a starting spot at prop over Korbin Sims in some matches. On 6 May, Ese’ese made his international debut for Samoa against England, playing off the interchange bench in the 30–10 loss at Campbelltown Stadium.

In July, he signed a three-year contract with the Newcastle Knights starting in 2018. In round 25, he scored his first ever NRL try against the Parramatta Eels, in Brisbane's 34–52 loss at Suncorp Stadium.

2018
In round 1 of the 2018 season, Ese'ese made his debut for Newcastle in their 19–18 golden point extra-time win over the Manly Warringah Sea Eagles.

2019
Ese'ese played 18 games in the 2019 NRL season for Newcastle as the club finished 11th on the table for a second consecutive year.

2020
In July, Ese'ese signed a two-year contract with the Gold Coast Titans starting in 2021.

2021
In round 10 of the 2021 NRL season, he was sent off for a high tackle during the Gold Coast's 48–12 loss against Penrith.

2022
Following the Gold Coast's decision not to extend Ese'ese's contract, former coach from the Brisbane Broncos, Wayne Bennett signed him to the Dolphins for the 2023 NRL season. 
He played a total of 13 games for the Gold Coast in the 2022 NRL season as the club finished 13th on the table.

References

External links

Newcastle Knights profile
NRL profile
2017 RLWC profile

1994 births
New Zealand sportspeople of Samoan descent
Gold Coast Titans players
Newcastle Knights players
Canterbury-Bankstown Bulldogs players
Brisbane Broncos players
Mangere East Hawks players
Wests Panthers players
Souths Logan Magpies players
Rugby league props
Rugby league locks
Living people
Samoa national rugby league team players
Rugby league players from Auckland